Bianca Merker (born Bianca Walter; 31 March 1990) is a German short track speed skater. She competed in the women's 500 metres at the 2018 Winter Olympics.

Biography
Walter was born in 1990 in EV Dresden. She was the daughter of the former speed skater Skadi Walter and she was brought up in an  enthusiastic family of skaters. Her mother was a successful skater and her grandmother was a figure skating coach. Walter was on skates at the age of three and by age of nine, she experimented with the short track at the former ESC Dresden.

In 2006 she became a member of the German Ladies Short Track national team when she was 16 and she made her international debut in the 2006/07 World Cup season in Saguenay in Canada, The same year she competed in the Junior World Championships where she was beaten in the heats. Walter won her first silver medal with German team at the European Championships in Turin.

References

External links
 

1990 births
Living people
Sportspeople from Dresden
People from Bezirk Dresden
German female short track speed skaters
Olympic short track speed skaters of Germany
Short track speed skaters at the 2018 Winter Olympics
21st-century German women